Equivalent VIII, 1966, 120 Firebricks, 5 x 27 x 90 ¼ inches, occasionally referred to as The Bricks, is the last of a series of minimalist sculptures by Carl Andre. The sculpture consists of 120 fire bricks, arranged in two layers, in a six-by-ten rectangle.

Each of Andre's eight sculptures in the Equivalent series consists of a rectangular arrangement of 120 firebricks. Although the shape of each sculpture is different, they all have the same height, mass and volume. Constructed in 1966, Equivalent VIII was bought by the Tate Gallery in 1972 for $6,000 (then £2,297), half of the 1966 price. As none of the pieces had been sold during their New York gallery exhibition, Andre had returned the original bricks for a refund so new bricks were bought and shipped to the UK along with instructions on how to arrange them.

When first exhibited at the Tate Gallery at Millbank in 1974 and 1975, it drew no great response. However, in February 1976, when it was not on display, the piece drew much criticism in the press because of the perception that taxpayers' money had been spent on paying an inflated price for a collection of bricks. The bricks were also defaced by Peter Stowell-Phillips, a chef who covered them with blue food dye. The purchase has also been criticised for only buying one of the series of eight arrangements, thus removing the context of their 'equivalence' and for failing to otherwise explain the concept of the piece.

The work is now housed in the Tate Modern on Bankside.

References

External links
 The Bricks at the Tate Modern

Minimalism
1966 sculptures
Brick sculptures
Collection of the Tate galleries